Toropylivka (Ukrainian: Торопилівка) is a railway station in Stepanivka, Sumy Oblast, Ukraine. The station serves as a minor passenger station as well as a major freight yard for nearby businesses in Stepanivka. It is on the Sumy Branch of Southern Railways on the Bilopillya-Basy line.

Toropylivka is located between the stations of Sumy ( away) and Holovashivka ( away).

History

The station dates back to its opening in 1895. The reason for the discovery was the construction of a sugar factory in 1893, which needed a railway to supply raw materials. (The village no longer exists.)

The first station house was built in 1906, but it has not survived to this day. The modern building was built in 1960, the current appearance of the station acquired after reconstruction in 2008.

Passenger service

Notes

 Tariff Guide No. 4. Book 1 (as of 05/15/2021) (Russian) Archived 05/15/2021.
 Ukraine. Atlas of Railways. Mirilo 1: 750 000. - K .: DNVP "Cartography", 2008. - 80 p. - ISBN 978-966-475-082-7.

References

External links
Information on Toropylivka station on railwayz.info
Rail trips - Toropylivka
Schedule for suburban trains and passenger trains

Railway stations in Sumy Oblast
Sumy
Buildings and structures in Sumy Oblast
1895 establishments in Ukraine